Nathan Elbaz (17 October 1932 – 11 February 1954) was an Israel Defense Forces soldier who sacrificed his life for his friends, receiving the Medal of Distinguished Service.

Biography

Elbaz was born in Morocco, to a Jewish family. He attended Hebrew school, and he and his friends dreamed of making aliyah. After the establishment of Israel in 1948, Elbaz and his friends were determined to move there. When he was 18, he left for Israel as part of Aliyat HaNoar ("Youth Aliyah").

Elbaz was inducted into the IDF in 1952 and served in the Infantry Corps. During his service, he was entrusted with the task of disassembling hand grenades. On 11 February 1954, Elbaz and another soldier were disassembling grenades, when a grenade he was holding was accidentally activated.  He immediately called out a warning to his comrades to take shelter, but when he saw that there was no way to throw the grenade without endangering them, he ran away from them, pressing it to his chest and was thus killed. For this action he received a posthumous citation from chief of staff Moshe Dayan. The citation was replaced with the Medal of Distinguished Service, after the latter was established in 1970.

Deaths by hand grenade
Israeli Mizrahi Jews
1932 births
1954 deaths
20th-century Moroccan Jews
Israeli people of Moroccan-Jewish descent
Recipients of the Medal of Distinguished Service
Burials at Kiryat Shaul Cemetery
Accidental deaths in Israel